William Charles McCorry (July 9, 1887 – March 22, 1973) was a Major League Baseball pitcher who played for the St. Louis Browns in . He had a long career as a player/manager in the minor leagues that lasted as late as 1942, including lengthy stints with the Albany Senators and Ogden Reds. He also served as traveling secretary for the New York Yankees and general manager of the Augusta Yankees.

In the late 1940s, McCorry also served as a scout. The Yankees sent him to Birmingham in 1949 to evaluate Willie Mays, but they passed on pursuing the prospect after McCorry complained that he "couldn't hit a curveball."

References

External links

1887 births
1973 deaths
St. Louis Browns players
Major League Baseball pitchers
Baseball players from New York (state)
Minor league baseball managers
McKeesport Tubers players
Lynn Shoemakers players
Albany Senators players
San Francisco Seals (baseball) players
Spokane Indians players
Portland Colts players
Ballard Pippins players
Pittsfield Hillies players
Waterbury Brasscos players
Rutland Sheiks players
Ogden Reds players
Cordele Reds players
Thomasville Lookouts players
New York Yankees executives
New York Yankees scouts
People from Saranac Lake, New York
Plattsburgh (baseball) players
Montpelier Goldfish players